Hojjat Kalashi is an Iranian pan-Iranist politician and head of the Pan-Iranist Party's youth wing.

He has been imprisoned several times and banned from leaving Iran.

Kalashi is a graduate of political science, and is regarded among younger generations of ethnic Iranian Azeris with nationalist-oriented tendencies. According to Mehran Kamrava, Kalashi has a positive image among Iranian nationalist groupings.

References

1979 births
Living people
People from Ardabil
Pan-Iranist Party politicians
Heads of youth wings of political parties in Iran
20th-century Iranian people
21st-century Iranian people
Iranian Azerbaijanis